Gadhimai Temple is a temple of Gadhimai Devi, an aspect of Kali, the Hindu goddess of power. The temple is situated in Mahagadhimai Municipality in Bara District of south central Nepal, though the term usually refers to Gadhimai festival, conducted at the Gadhimai temple area in central Terai of Nepal.

See also
 Shakti

References

External links

Kali temples
Hindu temples in Madhesh Province
Hindu temples practicing animal sacrifice
Buildings and structures in Bara District